Yevgeni Sergeevich Shaldybin (born 29 July 1975) is a Russian former professional ice hockey player who played three games in the National Hockey League for the Boston Bruins during the 1995–96 season. The rest of his career, which lasted from 1991 to 2014, was mainly spent in Russia, where he played in both the Russian Superleague, the Kontinental Hockey League, and the second-tier Supreme Hockey League.

Shaldybin scored one goal in his NHL career. It occurred on November 9, 1996 in Boston's 4-3 over the Ottawa Senators.

Career statistics

Regular season and playoffs

External links 

1975 births
Living people
Amur Khabarovsk players
B.C. Icemen players
Boston Bruins draft picks
Boston Bruins players
HC Khimik Voskresensk players
HC MVD players
HC Sibir Novosibirsk players
HC Spartak Moscow players
Las Vegas Thunder players
Lokomotiv Yaroslavl players
Metallurg Novokuznetsk players
Molot-Prikamye Perm players
Providence Bruins players
Russian ice hockey coaches
Russian ice hockey defencemen
Severstal Cherepovets players
Sportspeople from Novosibirsk
Torpedo Nizhny Novgorod players